Alana Smith (born October 20, 2000) is an American professional skateboarder from Mesa, Arizona. They are goofy-footed.

Skateboarding career 
In 2013, at the age of 12, Smith landed a 540 McTwist and became the youngest medalist in X Games history when they won silver in the women's park event at the X Games Barcelona.

They finished first in the Girls Combi Pool Classic at the World Cup of Skateboarding in 2015.

In 2016, Smith and Nora Vasconcellos joined the skate team of the Eugene, Oregon boardshop Tactics, as the brand's female ambassadors.

In 2021, Smith competed in the women's street skateboarding event at the 2020 Summer Olympics, finishing in last place out of the 20 competitors at the heat stage. In so doing, Smith became the first ever openly non-binary athlete to compete at the Olympics and had the pronouns "they/them" inscribed on their skateboard. However, a number of sports presenters misgendered Smith during coverage of the event, including BBC Sport commentators and commentators on an international feed that was broadcast on NBC Sports.

Personal life 
Smith is bisexual and non-binary, using they/them pronouns.
Other than skateboarding, Smith’s other hobbies include music, film, photography, and camping.
In 2021, Smith became involved with a corporate- and athletic- coaching company Exos which focuses on creating safe space skate sessions and were extremely happy to work with Exos right after the Tokyo games.  Smith has expressed how skateboarding has helped them in dark places and wants to help others find the love of the sport that has helped them keep going.  Smith was asked why they made their coming out and sexual identity public during an ESPN interview and shared that they wanted to show the world a side of them that is very vulnerable and sensitive while representing and helping kids that needed a support system.

References

External links
 
 Alana Smith at The Boardr
 

2000 births
Living people
American skateboarders
LGBT skateboarders
Non-binary sportspeople
Olympic skateboarders of the United States
Sportspeople from Mesa, Arizona
Skateboarders at the 2020 Summer Olympics
Bisexual sportspeople
American LGBT sportspeople
LGBT people from Arizona
21st-century American LGBT people
Bisexual non-binary people